Forsythia ,  is a genus of flowering plants in the olive family Oleaceae. There are about 11 species, mostly native to eastern Asia, but one native to southeastern Europe. Forsythia – also one of the plant's common names – is named after William Forsyth.

Description
Twigs may be hollow or chambered, depending on the species.

The flowers are produced in the early spring before the leaves, bright yellow with a deeply four-lobed flower, the petals joined only at the base. These become pendent in rainy weather thus shielding the reproductive parts.
The fruit is a dry capsule, containing several winged seeds.

There is a long-standing belief that forsythia flowers produce lactose, but lactose occurs only very rarely in natural sources other than milk, and attempts to find lactose in forsythia have been unsuccessful.

The genus is named after William Forsyth (1737–1804), a Scottish botanist who was a royal head gardener and a founding member of the Royal Horticultural Society.

Species

The following species of Forsythia have been documented:
 Forsythia europaea Degen & Bald. – Balkans in Albania and Serbia
 Forsythia giraldiana Lingelsh. – northwest China
 Forsythia × intermedia Zabel – an artificial garden hybrid between F. suspensa and F. viridissima
 Forsythia japonica Makino – Japan
 Forsythia koreana (Rehder) Nakai – Korea
 Forsythia likiangensis Ching & K.M.Feng – southwest China
 Forsythia × mandschurica Uyeki – northeast China
 Forsythia mira M.C.Chang – north central China
 Forsythia ovata Nakai – Korea
 Forsythia saxatilis  (Nakai) Nakai – Korea
 Forsythia suspensa (Thunb.) Vahl – eastern and central China
 Forsythia togashii H.Hara – Japan (Shōdoshima)
 Forsythia velutina Nakai – Korea
 Forsythia viridissima Lindl. – eastern China

A genetic study does not fully match the traditionally accepted species listed above, and groups the species in four clades: (1) F. suspensa; (2) F. europaea—F. giraldiana; (3) F. ovata—F. japonica—F. viridissima; and (4) F. koreana—F. mandschurica—F. saxatilis. Of the additional species, F. koreana is usually cited as a variety of F. viridissima, and F. saxatilis as a variety of F. japonica; the genetic evidence suggests they may be better treated as distinct species.

Forsythias are used as food plants by the larvae of some Lepidoptera species including the brown-tail and Gothic moth.

Garden history

Two species of forsythia are at the heart of the selected forms and garden hybrids: Forsythia suspensa and F. viridissima.  "These two species are, as it were, the founder-members of the forsythia family" writes Alice Coats; they were the earliest species brought into Western gardens from the Far East and they have each played a role in the modern garden shrubs.

Forsythia suspensa, the first to be noticed by a Westerner, was seen in a Japanese garden by the botanist-surgeon Carl Peter Thunberg, who included it (as a lilac) in his Flora Japonica 1784. Thunberg's professional connections lay with the Dutch East India Company, and F. suspensa reached Holland first, by 1833. In England, when it was being offered by Veitch Nurseries in Exeter at mid-century, it was still considered a rarity. Not all the varieties of suspensa are splaying and drooping, best seen hanging over a retaining wall; an erect form found by Fortune near Peking in 1861 was for a time classed as a species—F. fortunei.

Forsythia viridissma, meanwhile, had overtaken it in European gardens. The Scottish plant-hunter Robert Fortune "discovered" it—in a mandarin garden of the coastal city of Chusan (Zhoushan)—before he ever saw it growing wild in the mountains in Zhejiang province.

Forsythia × intermedia, as its name suggests, is a hybrid of F. suspensa and F. viridissima, introduced in continental Europe about 1880. Repeated crosses of the same two parents have made reiterations of F. × intermedia quite variable. A bud sport of a particularly showy (spectabilis) form is widely marketed as F. × intermedia 'Lynwood Variety'. This cultivar has gained the Royal Horticultural Society's Award of Garden Merit, as have F. × intermedia   'Courtalyn' and F.  'Courtasol'.

About the time of the First World War further species were discovered by plant hunters in China: F. giraldian (found in Gansu, 1910) and F. ovata (collected from seed in Korea by E.H. Wilson) have been particularly useful as seed parents in 20th-century American crosses.

Cultivation and uses

Forsythias are popular early spring flowering shrubs in gardens and parks, especially during Eastertide; Forsythias are nicknamed the Easter Tree, the symbol of the coming spring. Two are commonly cultivated for ornament, Forsythia × intermedia and Forsythia suspensa. They are both spring flowering shrubs, with yellow flowers. They are grown and prized for being tough, reliable garden plants. Forsythia × intermedia is the more commonly grown, is smaller, has an upright habit, and produces strongly coloured flowers. Forsythia suspensa is a large to very large shrub, can be grown as a weeping shrub on banks, and has paler flowers. Many named garden cultivars can also be found. Blooming Forsythia cuttings are frequently brought indoors in the early spring.

Commercial propagation is usually by cuttings, taken from green wood after flowering in late spring to early summer; alternatively, cuttings may be taken between November and February. Low hanging boughs often take root, and can be removed for transplanting. A common practice (known as layering) is to place a weight over a branch to keep it on the ground and, after it has rooted, to dig up the roots and cut the rooted part from the main branch; this can then be planted.

Forsythia suspensa is considered one of the 50 fundamental herbs in Chinese herbology. Forsythia sticks are used to bow a Korean string instrument called ajaeng.

Common names
In some regions, the plant may be known as Easter tree and the flowers as yellow bells. In Iran, the plant is known as “yellow Jasmine”.

Gallery

References

External links

BBC – Forsythia page
Forsythia viridissima Vanderbilt University – Forsythia page

Forsythieae
Oleaceae genera
Plants used in bonsai
Taxa named by Martin Vahl